Arnold Doren (1935–2003) was an American photographer.

Youth
Arnold T. Dorenfeld, known as Doren, was born in Chicago, July 29, 1935, to Hy and Rose Dorenfeld. He grew up on the west side of Chicago, attending Howland Elementary School and Farragut High School (now Farragut Career Academy) (per classmate and friend Howard N. Allen, M.D.). An encounter with a Graflex camera while working on the high school newspaper (The Scroll) led to a dedicated life in photography. After joining the Navy in 1953, he was stationed at San Diego, CA and worked as a submariner running missions to Acapulco. News with Views was the name of the Navy newsletter which published his photographs.

Education
A turning point occurred when he enrolled at Rochester Institute of Technology in 1957 where his philosophy and purpose in life were clarified by Minor White, one of the legendary professors. It was the deeply spiritual nature of Minor White along with his knowledge of poetry and Eastern philosophy that affected Doren. Minor put an emphasis on feeling as a way of knowing and realizing a multitude of meanings. A quote by Peter Layton describes Minor's teaching. " He created an atmosphere for constantly questioning ideas or responses." With discipline and sincerity, the students of Minor White could achieve an awareness called equivalence that was partly derived from Alfred Stieglitz's expressive theory. It was under Minor's influence that Doren began to photograph Americana Faces which was a documentation of the land and its people from 1960-2003. He photographed throughout the USA and returned frequently to the southwest. While working on the Americana Faces, he produced series on Italy, Greece, Scotland and China. Related to Doren's traditional photographs were the experimental works inspired by Minor White and by another influential teacher, Ralph Hattersley.

New York City 1960-1978
During Doren's NYC years, he worked as a commercial photographer for Alan Vogel, Arnold T. Rosenberg, Irving Penn and Erwin Blumenthal while living in a one-room apartment and frequenting jazz clubs, poetry readings and art openings. Doren wrote extensively about his years in NYC with and without his first wife, Elizabeth Knox, a painter. He committed to several personal projects such as photographing the same NYC street for one hour per day for several years. The NYC street project was partly inspired by his neighbor, Berenice Abbott. Doren's series on the Woodstock Festival resulted in his well-known photograph of Jimi Hendrix.

1978-2003

After accepting a teaching position in 1978 at the University of North Carolina at Greensboro, Doren helped to shape the growing respect for photography as art. He educated thousands of students, participated in numerous exhibitions, operated a photography gallery and gained national and international recognition for his work. Often he introduced himself on the first day of class with My name is Doren and photography is my life. Doren's second wife, Caroline Cornish, 1924–2008, was a noted photographer who possessed organizational skills that provided stability for both of them while allowing Doren extra freedom to pursue a fine arts career.

Publications

"The Photographer Collector's Guide" Lee Witkin and B. London, NY Graphic Society, 1982
"An Index to American Collections" The George Eastman House of Photography, G. K. Hall and Co. Publishing, Boston, 1983
"Who is Who in American Art" R. R. Bowker Publishers, NY,  1989–90, 1991-91, 1995–96
"Aperture" 10-3, 1962
"Photographing Children", Time Life Library of Photography, 1971
Octave to Prayer "Aperture", 1974
"Italy Observed in Photography and Literature", Rizzoli Publishing, NY, 1989
"Exploring Color Photography" by Robert Hirsh, W. B. Brown Publishing, 1991

Selected collections

George Eastman House, Rochester, NY
Massachusetts Institute of Technology, Cambridge, Massachusetts
Museum of the Rhode Island School of Design, Providence, RI
Dallas Museum of Art, Dallas, TX
Grey Gallery of Art New York University, NYC
Phillip Morris Collection, Cabarrus County, NC
Dillard Collection, "Weatherspoon Art Gallery", University of North Carolina at Greensboro
Meridian Museum of Art, Meridian, Mississippi
Indiana Historical Society, Indianapolis, Indiana

References

External links
UNCG Special Collections & University Archives past exhibits: Arnold Doren

1935 births
2003 deaths
20th-century American photographers
Farragut Career Academy alumni
Street photographers
20th-century American educators
American art educators